John Heydon may refer to:

 John Heydon (astrologer), English occult philosopher, astrologer and attorney
 John Heydon (footballer), English footballer
 John Heydon (died 1479), lawyer
 Sir John Heydon, English military commander and mathematician